Xinhua District is one of eight districts of the prefecture-level city of Shijiazhuang, the capital of Hebei Province, North China, located in the northwest of the urban core of Shijiazhuang.

Sanlu, when it existed, had its headquarters in Xinhua.

Administrative divisions
There are 11 subdistricts, 2 towns, and 2 townships.

Subdistricts:
Gexin Subdistrict
Xinhua Road Subdistrict
Ning'an Subdistrict
Dongjiao Subdistrict
Xiyuan Subdistrict
Hezuo Road Subdistrict
Lianmeng Subdistrict
Shigang Subdistrict
Wuqi Subdistrict
Tianyuan Subdistrict
Beiyuan Subdistrict

Towns:
Daguo
Zhaolingpuxi

Townships:
Sanzhuang Township
Dubei Township

References

External links

County-level divisions of Hebei
Shijiazhuang